Novus ("new" in Latin) may refer to:

Companies
 Novus Biologicals, a biotech company based in Littleton, Colorado, US
 Novus Entertainment, a Canadian telecommunications company
 Novus International, an animal health and nutrition company
 Novus Leisure, a British company owning bars and nightclubs
 Novus Partners, a portfolio intelligence platform for institutional investors
 Novus Records, an American jazz record label
 Novus, a former processing-center partner of Discover Card
 Novus Organics, an Australian Organics company focussed on bringing its customers premium quality organic products the planet can offer
 Novus Fintech, with offices in Australia and Vietnam, products focused on TOMS (Trade Order Management System), servicing Banks and Financial Institutions

Other
 Tata Novus, a truck introduced in 2005
 Novus, a planet in the Stargate Universe episode "Common Descent"
 Novus, a race of sentient machines from the video game Universe at War: Earth Assault
 "Novus", a song by Santana from Shaman

See also
 Novuss, a game of physical skill